Regency Downs is a rural and residential locality in the Lockyer Valley Region, Queensland, Australia.

Geography 
Regency Downs is located in the Lockyer Valley. It is approximately 75 kilometres from Brisbane and 55 kilometres from Toowoomba. It is immediately north of the Warrego Highway and Plainland and east of Glenore Grove.

Administration 
The Lockyer Valley Regional Council is the local government authority for Regency Downs.

History 
The locality was named and bounded on 3 June 1994 and amended on 26 May 2000. The district was re-gazetted on 29 August 2008 due to local council amalgamations under the Local Government Reform Implementation Act 2007.

References 

Lockyer Valley Region
Localities in Queensland